Bracamonte may refer to:

People
 Bernardino Meneses y Bracamonte, Count of Peñalba, Spanish nobleman and military leader
 Cecilia Bracamonte, Peruvian singer
 Gaspar de Bracamonte, 3rd Count of Peñaranda, Spanish diplomat and statesman
 Héctor Bracamonte, Argentinean footballer

See also
 Bracamontes
 Peñaranda de Bracamonte
 Rubí de Bracamonte